Jane Lewkenor, Lady Pole of Trotton, Sussex (c. 1492–1562) was a member of the English nobility.

Family 
Jane Lewkenor (c. 1503) was the daughter and co-heiress of Sir Roger Lewkenor (b. 1469 and died January 15, 1543, in Trotton, Sussex) of Trotton, Sussex - a paternal grandson of Sir Roger Lewknor and Alianora de Camoys - and wife Eleanor Tuchet - daughter of John Tuchet, 6th Baron Audley and 3rd Baron Tuchet and Anne Echingham. Jane's father remarried twice and had three daughters by his third wife who were half-sisters and co-heirs with Jane:
 Katherine who married William Morgan of Chilworth, Surrey
 Mabel who married Anthony Stapley of Sussex (no issue)
 Constance who married Edward Glentham

Marriages 
Her first husband was Sir Christopher Pickering of Ellerton (c. 1490 in Yorkshire and died September 7, 1516, in Woodbridge, Suffolk), whom she married before 1516.

Jane's second husband was Arthur Pole, son of Margaret Pole, Countess of Salisbury, whom she married before 24 October 1522, most likely around 1526. The couple had at least four children: Henry(c1525), Jane, Margaret (b. 1527 in Racton, England) who married Sir Thomas Fitzherbert, and Mary (b. 1528 in Racton, England) who married Sir John Stanley.

When Arthur died, his mother and brother, Lady Salisbury and her son, Lord Montague, did not wish Jane to remarry, which would deprive the Pole family, and Arthur's heirs, of her fortune. They coerced Jane to become a novice at Syon Abbey. Jane was eventually released from her vows by William Barlow, the new Bishop of St. Asaph, who was residing in his priory of Bisham. She said to Bishop Barlow, 'Can I leave the veil at pleasure?'; 'Yes, for all religious persons have a time of probation. You are only a novice and could leave your nun's weeds at your pleasure. I bind you no further...', he said.

In 1539, Jane married Sir William Barentyne (b. 31 Dec. 1481 - d. 17 Nov. 1549), Sheriff of Oxfordshire & Berkshire. Their marriage was declared void by the consistory court of London on 15 December 1540 because of Jane's vow of chastity.  The Barentynes' sought and received an Act of Parliament to declare their marriage valid and their children legitimate in 1544 after the passage of the Act of the Six Articles.  Despite the passage of this act (34 and 35 Hen. VIII, c.1543/44), Jane and William's sons were still trying to secure their inheritance in 1563.

Children 
Jane had the following children:
 Anne Pickering (b. 1514-1582) Anne who married Sir Francis Weston and then Sir Henry Knyvet (c. 1510-1547), who in 1539 fought for his wife's inheritance on the grounds that the children of Jane's third marriage were not legitimate because of their mother's vow of chastity after the death of her second husband. Anne married her third husband, John Vaughan (d. 25 June 1577) around 1549.  Anne's children were as follows:
 Sir Henry Weston, MP (b. 1535)
 Anne Weston who married Sir Francis Keilway
 Sir Henry Knyvet, MP, of Charlton (c. 1537 Charlton, Wiltshire, England)
 Margaret Knyvet, who married Henry Vavasour
 Catherine Knyvet who married Sir Henry Paget, 2nd Baron Paget of Beaudesert and then Edward Carey, MP (c. 1543 Buckenham, Norfolk, England)
 Elizabeth Knyvet who married Anthony Radcliffe (c. 1544 London, England)
 Sir Thomas Knyvet, 1st Baron Knyvet (c, 1545 Escrisk, Yorkshire, England)
 Alice Knyvett (c. 1546 Charlton, Wiltshire, England)
 Anne Knyvett (c. 1547 Charlton, Wiltshire, England)
 Frances Vaughan who married Sir Thomas Burgh, 3rd Baron Burgh
 Margaret Pole (b. 1527 in Racton, England)
 Mary Pole  (b. 1529 in Racton, England)
 Jane Pole
 Henry Pole (c1525-c1533)
 Drew Barentyne
 Charles Barentyne

Jane died 12 March 1562/63.

Fictional portrayals 
 The story of her marriage to Arthur and subsequent quarrels with his family is told in the 2014 novel The King's Curse by Philippa Gregory.

References

 http://www.historyofparliamentonline.org/volume/1509-1558/member/barentyne-(barrington)-sir-william-1481-1549
Hazel Pierce, ‘Pole, Margaret, suo jure countess of Salisbury (1473–1541)’, Oxford Dictionary of National Biography, Oxford University Press, 2004; online edn, May 2015 [http://www.oxforddnb.com/view/article/22451, accessed 9 Oct 2015]
http://www.oxford-shakespeare.com/Probate/PROB_11-64-217.pdf

Jane
People from Trotton
1503 births
1562 deaths
16th-century English people